Erdahl is an unincorporated community in Erdahl Township, Grant County, Minnesota, United States. The community is located between Evansville and Elbow Lake on Minnesota State Highway 79.

History
Erdahl was platted in 1887. A post office was established at Erdahl in 1883, and remained in operation until 1954.

References

Further reading
Rand McNally Road Atlas - 2007 edition - Minnesota entry
Official State of Minnesota Highway Map - 2007/2008 edition

Unincorporated communities in Minnesota
Unincorporated communities in Grant County, Minnesota